There have been seven baronetcies created for persons with the surname Thompson, one in the Baronetage of England, one in the Baronetage of Great Britain and five in the Baronetage of the United Kingdom. Three of the creations are extinct while four are extant. See also Thomson baronets and Meysey-Thompson baronets.

The Thompson Baronetcy, of Haversham in the County of Buckingham, was created in the Baronetage of England on 12 December 1673 for John Thompson. He was later elevated to the peerage as Baron Haversham. For more information, see this title.

The Thompson Baronetcy, of Virkees in the County of Sussex, was created in the Baronetage of Great Britain on 23 June 1797 for Charles Thompson, who represented Monmouth in the House of Commons. The title became extinct on the death of the third Baronet in 1868.

The Thompson Baronetcy, of Hartsbourne Manor in the County of Hertford, was created in the Baronetage of the United Kingdom on 11 December 1806 for the naval commander Vice-Admiral Thomas Thompson. He notably commanded HMS Leander at the Battle of the Nile and also sat as Member of Parliament for Rochester.

The Thompson Baronetcy, of Park Gate in Guiseley in the County of York, was created in the Baronetage of the United Kingdom on 18 April 1890 for Matthew Thompson. He was Chairman of the Forth Bridge and Midland Railway companies and also briefly represented Bradford in Parliament as a Liberal.

The Thompson Baronetcy, of Wimpole Street in the City of London, was created in the Baronetage of the United Kingdom on 20 February 1899 for the surgeon Sir Henry Thompson. The title became extinct on the death of the second Baronet in 1944.

The Thompson Baronetcy, of Reculver in the County of Kent, was created in the Baronetage of the United Kingdom on 28 January 1963 for the Conservative politician Richard Thompson. He held several junior ministerial positions, notably as Under-Secretary of State for Commonwealth Relations. As of 2008 the title is held by his son, the second Baronet, who succeeded in 1999.

The Thompson Baronetcy, of Walton-on-the-Hill in the City of Liverpool, was created in the Baronetage of the United Kingdom on 29 January 1963 for the Conservative politician Kenneth Thompson. He was Chairman of the Merseyside County Council and represented Liverpool, Walton in the House of Commons. As of 2008 the title is held by his son, the second Baronet, who succeeded in 1984.

Thompson baronets, of Haversham (1673)
see the Baron Haversham

Thompson baronets, of Virkees (1797)
Sir Charles Thompson, 1st Baronet (–1799)
Sir Norborne Thompson, 2nd Baronet (1785–1826)
Sir Henry Thompson, 3rd Baronet (1796–1868)

Thompson baronets, of Hartsbourne Manor (1806)
Sir Thomas Boulden Thompson, GCB, 1st Baronet (1766–1828)
Sir Thomas Raikes Trigge Thompson, 2nd Baronet (1804–1865)
Sir Thomas Raikes Thompson, 3rd Baronet (1852–1904)
Sir Thomas Raikes Lovett Thompson, MC, 4th Baronet (1881–1964)
Sir (Thomas) Lionel Tennyson Thompson, 5th Baronet (1921–1999)
Sir Thomas d'Eyncourt John Thompson, 6th Baronet (born 1956)

The heir apparent to the baronetcy is Thomas Boulden Cameron Thompson (born 2006), only son of the 6th Baronet.

Thompson baronets, of Park Gate (1890)
Sir Matthew William Thompson, 1st Baronet (1820–1891)
Sir Peile Thompson, 2nd Baronet (1844–1918)
Sir Matthew William Thompson, 3rd Baronet (1872–1956)
Sir Peile Beaumont Thompson, 4th Baronet (1874–1972)
Sir Peile Thompson, MBE, 5th Baronet (1911–1985)
Sir Christopher Peile Thompson, 6th Baronet (born 1944)

The heir apparent to the baronetcy is Peile Richard Thompson (born 1975), only son of the 6th Baronet.

Thompson baronets, of Wimpole Street (1899)
Sir Henry Thompson, 1st Baronet (1820–1904)
Sir Henry Francis Herbert Thompson, 2nd Baronet (1859–1944)

Thompson baronets, of Reculver (1963)
Sir Richard Hilton Marler Thompson, 1st Baronet (1912–1999)
Sir Nicholas Annesley Marler Thompson, 2nd Baronet (born 1947)

The heir apparent to the baronetcy is Simon William Thompson (born 1985), eldest son of the 2nd Baronet.

Thompson baronets, of Walton-on-the-Hill (1963)
Sir Kenneth Pugh Thompson, 1st Baronet (1909–1984)
Sir Paul Anthony Thompson, 2nd Baronet (born 1939)

The heir apparent to the baronetcy is Richard Kenneth Spencer Thompson (born 1976), eldest son of the 2nd Baronet.

Notes

References
Kidd, Charles, Williamson, David (editors). Debrett's Peerage and Baronetage (1990 edition). New York: St Martin's Press, 1990,

See also
Thomson baronets
Meysey-Thompson baronets

Baronetcies in the Baronetage of Great Britain
Baronetcies in the Baronetage of the United Kingdom
Extinct baronetcies in the Baronetage of England
Extinct baronetcies in the Baronetage of Great Britain
Extinct baronetcies in the Baronetage of the United Kingdom